Visitors to Benin must obtain a visa from one of the Beninese diplomatic missions or apply for an e-Visa, unless they come from one of the visa exempt countries.

Visa policy map

Visa exemption 
Citizens of the following 59 countries and territories can visit Benin without a visa for up to the number of days listed below, according to the Ministry of Foreign Affairs and Cooperation:

#: Not listed by Timatic as being visa-exempt.
*: Indonesian artists and journalists are not eligible for visa exemption, and must obtain a visa.

Additionally, nationals of  who are traveling on duty may visit Benin for a maximum stay of 90 days.

In addition, holders of diplomatic or official/service passports of Brazil, China, Cuba, France, India, Iran (1 month), Italy, Mexico, Russia, South Korea, Switzerland, Turkey  do not require a visa.

e-Visa
Nationals of countries that require a visa can obtain an electronic visa. Electronic visas are available for stays up to 30 days (single and multiple) and 90 days (multiple).

See also

 Visa requirements for Beninese citizens

References

External links 
eVisa Benin

Benin
Foreign relations of Benin